In baseball statistics, a relief pitcher is credited with a save (denoted by SV) who finishes a game for the winning team under certain prescribed circumstances. Most commonly a pitcher earns a save by entering in the ninth inning of a game in which his team is winning by three or fewer runs and finishing the game by pitching one inning without losing the lead.

Mariano Rivera is the all-time leader in saves with 652. Rivera and Trevor Hoffman are the only pitchers in MLB history to save more than 600 career games. Lee Smith, Francisco Rodríguez, John Franco, and Billy Wagner are the only other pitchers to save more than 400 games in their careers.

Key

List

Stats updated as of the end of the 2022 season.

Notes

References

External links 
 
 Major League Baseball

Saves
Major League Baseball statistics